Pakistan's e-trading mainly involves buying and selling goods, and services using internet or telephone, through the use of electronic means such as computer, fax machine, cellular phone, automated teller machines (ATM), and other electronic appliances with or without using inter-net. Online banking, e-ticketing for air travelling, share trading in stock exchange are few examples of e-commerce of modern advancement.  With its potential, e-trading can reduce the cost per transaction, increase efficiency, support contest, lower prices and boost international demand. It can open new areas for business in the service sector like on-line education, medical services, consultancy, and data exchange. It can also provide expansion in trade through domestic and international market research, advertising and marketing. In the financial services area, it can make easy and speedy transactions and transfer of money at a minimum risk. The interesting feature of online trading is that an investor simply sitting in his office or home can buy or sell through the Internet via mobile/tablet or PC and before being an experienced trader he may learn a lot by watching market screens or web portals at his convenience.

Electronic trading under e-commerce
The term e-trading (or electronic trading) covers a series of systems ranging from simple order transmission service to full-fledged trade execution. e-trade is location neutral and is scalable that mainly providing electronic orders executed from users to the system owned by the seller or manufacturer.  Electronic distribution of offer with the provision of transaction details – i.e., description of the offer, quality, cost, guarantee, validity, discounts, quantity etc. – is carried out through automated trade execution. Most commonly, three categories are well recognized under e-commerce, namely:
(i)	Business-to-consumer (B2C) e-commerce: customers deal directly with the organization, avoiding any intermediaries
(ii)	Business-to-business (B2B) participants are organizations
(iii)	Consumer-to-consumer (C2C) participants are individuals, with one serving as the buyer and the other as the seller

E-commerce is the name given to commerce activities, e.g. sale, purchase, transfer, or exchange of products, services, and/or information, conducted using electronic means and technologies. However, in the general sense, e-commerce is referred to as online transactions.  Sometimes the terms e-commerce and e-business are used interchangeably but are distinct concepts involving three and four integrations, respectively.  E-business is more difficult as compared to e-commerce.  The E-marketplace is one of the forms of e-commerce organization with online trading and online shopping, where buyers and sellers meet to exchange goods, services, money or information or any consideration thereof.

E-commerce in Pakistan' was first started in 2001.  With the ban of PayPal services in Pakistan,  eCommerce business companies and merchants had to rely on cash on delivery, and bank payment methods. There was no dedicated online payment service operating in Pakistan, which was also not favorable for online buyers in Pakistan. However, the need was fulfilled to an extent with the launch of mobile payment systems in Pakistan. In October 2009, Telenor launched "Easypaisa" Mobile Account Service through which users could pay bills, transfer money domestically, internationally and even can save money in their Easy Paisa Mobile Account.

Scope of e-trading and e-governance
Asad Ali Shah, former provincial minister, speaking as a chief guest at a Student Seminar organized by the Department of Computer Science of Sindh Madressatul Islam University on “Future of E-Commerce in Pakistan” stated that E-governance is essential for effective governance and administration, and in Pakistan besides e-commerce, m-commerce means business through mobile technology is also growing rapidly, that is giving a boost to our economic and commercial activities in Pakistan. In his speech, Dr Muhammad Ali Shaikh, Vice Chancellor of Sindh Madressatul Islam, said that e-commerce is the future of the country. Earlier, Pakistan had witnessed two big revolutions; one was of telecommunication, and the second was of satellite television channels that changed the old Pakistani society. Now e-commerce is getting its roots in society, but there are also some obstacles in its way, that must be removed, he added.

There is a lot of scope for E-commerce in Pakistan, and most companies (of all categories) are moving to the digital world; the study found that 84% of the organizations have an internet account.  Survey statistics reveal that 59% of the organizations have either an in-house or vendor-supported Web server, and 67% of the surveyed organization have a homepage.

Obstacles to e-business
Major obstacles in the way of e-commerce growth in Pakistan are:
Low literacy rate in the society, as most parts of the country particularly rural areas, are lacking education.
Shortage of power (the huge gap between demand and supply of electricity due to insufficient production)

 Lack of participation from the banking sector, mainstream banks are hesitant/reluctant to provide merchant services for online buying and selling websites.
 No policies made by the government of Pakistan for the E-commerce sector

Online trading
With the introduction of information technology (IT), e-commerce is producing new fast-growing areas like online buying and selling of financial instruments e.g. shares of public or private limited companies over the Internet, including the sale purchase of commodities, currencies, and gold. With the introduction of the World Wide Web, almost all transactions can be carried out using a computer or mobile phone through proprietary software. Customers have the ability to purchase a wide range of products and services from various industries. Online trade or e-trade is one of the fastest emerging electronic commerce markets globally, Pakistan is enjoying the drive of e-commerce through its youth, rapidly growth proves their competency over latest approach and strategy. Besides its other innovations, E-trading is extending opportunities in the overall retail segment irrespective of business size; not only retailers are entering into the market for sell of products by applying different web portals, telecast selling through different TV channels has also been added by medium or large firms for direct sell to the consumer in addition to their web stores

Online stores
To maintain the progress of active online customers, Pakistan’s pioneer e-commerce portal hosts more than 1.2 million distinctive visitors on its website every month and presents a selection of over 400 products and 16,000 merchandise. E-commerce is likely to develop at a fast rate if the challenge for customer satisfaction and operational efficiency is ensured at a marginal level. Web or phone-based sell/purchase of grocery covers a vast area with good volume and variety. In the recent past, a number of different online grocery stores have started in Pakistan by selling domestic consumer items like rice, lentils, daals, oils, fruit, and vegetables, including household and personal items e.g. washing powder, shampoos, and toothpaste.

Many other sites have been established with the aim of fashion-oriented exports. Today a number of small and medium-scale online stores are conducting business across Pakistan with the delivery of purchased items at the doorstep of their consumers.

In Jan 2021 beginning, a joint venture, and online marketplace, namely leyjao claimed successful collaboration with the sellers during the covid-19 strenuous days, when shopkeepers were incapable of opening their shops during the lockdown, so they stepped in and support them to sell their essential goods, which were permitted during those days.

Investment and finance
Shares trading in stock exchange can provide reward and investment in stocks may increase in value besides paying dividends to its investor. Shareholder receives rewards when the company performs well and the value of shares goes up. But if the company does poorly, the share price falls down and the value of an investment will be reduced.  Among other issues, the performance of shares market, economic environment, and political stability are all responsible for an increase or decrease in the value of investments.  Therefore, trading in the shares market is regarded as an investment in “risk capital”.   Strength to sustain this risk with careful planning results in reward and shareholders can receive the prospective return on their investment as much higher than that on other investments.

Shares-trading
All companies engaged in stock trading with or without on line trading platform are required to observe the Securities and Exchange Commission of Pakistan as the financial regulatory agency in Pakistan for their business.
Online share trading in Pakistan is available in 3 stock markets Karachi Stock Exchange (KSE), Lahore Stock Exchange (LSE) and Islamabad Stock Exchange (ISE).  An investor with a minimum amount of Pakistani Rupees 25,000/ to 1,00,000/ (or equivalent) can open an account with broker and do stock trade online. Online trading can be availed by resident and non-resident investors, subject to meeting criteria prescribed by the regulatory authority.

Government's support to capital market for e-trading promotion
To encourage the general public towards investment in stocks by availing online facilities, Government of Pakistan has taken some initiatives to have maximum domestic as well as foreign investment in Pakistan’s shares market.  Listed below are some steps taken in this behalf:
(i) IPO: (Initial public offering) SECP has introduced the concept of e–IPO, i.e. electronic submission of subscription form, which enables the investors to make application for subscription of shares via internet.

(ii) Financial Literacy: The Lahore Stock Exchange is proactive in encouraging financial literacy in the South Asian nation. In 2014, the LSE commenced an online training competition for participants to be trained and familiarized with the stock market.

(iii) e-Dividend' service: Central Depository Company (CDC) of Pakistan Limited has introduced e-Dividend service for stock market.  This service provides transfer of dividend warrant and bonus issue of certificates electronically which saves time and expenses, by crediting cash or certificate in the bank account or investors’ account with his stock broker respectively.

(iv) Payment by Credit Cards: SECP has introduced in capital market payment of fee through credit cards with a view to promote the paperless environment towards its e-commerce regime.  This facilitates stakeholders submit returns/forms online without visiting banks or affiliated offices of SECP

E-banking
The rise of e-payment products like e-wallets, m-wallets, multi-purpose cards and smart applications evolved by new technologies like Near Field Communications (NFC) cards and non-bank players like Payment System Operators (PSOs) and Payment System Providers (PSPs) are incoming to the marketplace for joint manufactured goods or service modernization. The State Bank in its annual payment system review for the Financial year 2013-14 has disclosed that Pakistan shows its advancement towards quickly emergent international payments practices, with reasonable increase in usage of e-banking as recorded in Financial Year 2013-14.

Per quarterly reports, 61.7 million transactions through ATMs with an increase of 10.2% in ATMS uses have been witnessed during 2013. The quarterly report of October–December 2014 also recorded 112.3 million of e-banking transactions with reported amount of Rs.8.8 trillion.  Also users of internet and mobile  banking hit 18.62 million in the period under reference

Online complaints
The Karachi Police of Sindh capital with its plan to facilitate the citizens of Karachi to register online complaints that can be converted into First Information Reports (FIR) is another step towards online applications for the benefits of Pakistani people. This move by Karachi Police is replication of a similar project in Khyber Pakhtunkhwa. The FIR registration for recording citizens’ grievances through the internet without visiting police stations is an exemplary initiative for other mega cities of sub-continent.

Duplicate billing
In Pakistan one can now print or Download PDF copy of Electricity Bill or its Duplicate copy by entering customer/consumer Account Number allotted by the concerned Electric Supply Company, in addition to lodging online complaints against power failure/shut down or other matters affiliated with the relation between customer and power supplying company.

See also

Brokerage firm
Electronic business
Electronic trading platform
Kaymu Pakistan
Open outcry

References

 
Business in Pakistan
Economy of Pakistan